Minuscule 847 (in the Gregory-Aland numbering) is a 12th-century Greek minuscule manuscript of the New Testament on parchment. The manuscript has no complex content.

Description 
The codex contains the text of the Gospel of Matthew and Gospel of Mark on 280 parchment leaves (size ), with a catena. The text is written in one column per page, 33 lines per page.
The biblical text is surrounded by a catena.

Text 
The Greek text of the codex is a representative of the Byzantine text-type. Kurt Aland the Greek text of the codex did not place in any Category.

History 

F. H. A. Scrivener and C. R. Gregory dated the manuscript to the 12th century. Other palaeographers dated it to the 14th century. Currently the manuscript is dated by the INTF to the 12th century.

The manuscript once belonged to Cardinal Domenico Passionei.

The manuscript was added to the list of New Testament manuscripts by Scrivener (723e) and Gregory (847e). Gregory saw it in 1886.

Currently the manuscript is housed at the Biblioteca Angelica (Ms. 36), in Rome.

See also 

 List of New Testament minuscules
 Biblical manuscript
 Textual criticism
 Minuscule 846

References

Further reading

External links 
 

Greek New Testament minuscules
12th-century biblical manuscripts